The Tineinae are a subfamily of moths of the family Tineidae.

Genera

 Acridotarsa
 Anomalotinea
 Asymphyla
 Ceratobia
 Ceratophaga
 Ceratuncus
 Crypsithyris
 Crypsithyrodes
 Eccritothrix
 Elatobia
 Enargocrasis
 Eremicola
 Graphicoptila
 Hippiochaetes
 Kangerosithyris
 Lipomerinx
 Metatinea
 Miramonopis
 Monopis
 Nearolyma
 Niditinea
 Ocnophilella
 Phereoeca
 Praeacedes
 Pringleophaga
 Proterodesma
 Proterospastis
 Reisserita
 Stemagoris
 Tetrapalpus
 Thomintarra
 Tinea
 Tinemelitta
 Tineola
 Tineomigma
 Trichophaga
 Tryptodema
 Wyoma
 Xerantica

References